Sahl Swarz (May 4, 1912 – October 24, 2004) was an American sculptor and arts educator.

Biography

Sahl Swarz was born on May 4, 1912 in New York City to Jewish emigrants to the United States from the Austrian part of the partitioned Poland.

One of his students was sculptor Barbara Lekberg.

He taught sculpture at the University of Wisconsin and Columbia University. Swarz  was an Arts and Letters Awards in art winner (1955), and twice Guggenheim Fellowship recipient (1955, 1958).

In 1978, he married sculptor , and they moved to live in Japan and later in Verona in province of Lucca, Italy. In 1998, he moved to Pietrasanta, in province of Lucca, Italy.

Swarz died on October 24, 2004 in Pietrasanta, Italy.

Works and books
Statue of Gen. Daniel Davidson Bidwell (1952, Colonial Circle, Buffalo, New York)
The Guardian (1937), Brookgreen Gardens, Murrells Inlet, South Carolina, (a young male standing with a long bow and a dog sitting at his feet)
Sahl Swarz: Mosaic and Metal Sculpture, 1954,  ASIN: B00226MEM2
Sahl Swarz 1912 -2004: Retrospective of His Life Work, Museum of Contemporary Sculpture, Tokyo, 2007
Fifty years of sculpture by Sahl Swarz, 1933–1983, Verona : Edizioni La Quaglia, 1983,

References

1912 births
2004 deaths
Jewish American artists
20th-century American sculptors
American male sculptors
20th-century American Jews
21st-century American Jews
20th-century American male artists